Parque Paseo del Teleférico is a park in the city of Puebla, in the Mexican state of Puebla.

References

Parks in Mexico
Puebla (city)